Caranguejeira is a civil parish in the municipality of Leiria, Portugal. The population in 2011 was 4,691, in an area of 30.99 km².

References

Parishes of Leiria